{| 

{{Infobox ship characteristics
| Hide header = 
| Header caption = 
| Ship class = 
| Ship tons burthen=103, or 105, or 106, or 107<ref>[https://hdl.handle.net/2027/mdp.39015024214556?urlappend=%3Bseq=487 'Register of Shipping (1826), Seq.No.P521.]</ref> (bm)
| Ship length = 
| Ship beam = 
| Ship draught = 
| Ship draft = 
| Ship hold depth = 
| Ship propulsion = 
| Ship sail plan = Sloop or schooner
| Ship complement =
| Ship armament =
| Ship notes = 
}}
|}Prince of Saxe Coburg (or Prince Saxe Coburg) was launched at Cowes in 1803 or so under another name. She acquired the name Prince of Saxe Coburg in 1816. She then sailed to the eastern Atlantic. Her owners decided in 1826 to send her on a seal hunting voyage to the South Shetland Islands. She was wrecked at Tierra del Fuego in December.

CareerPrince of Saxe Coburg first appeared in Lloyd's Register (LR) in 1816. Original research may be required to determine her earlier name or names. 

 

Pirie & Co. appointed Matthew Brisbane captain of Prince of Saxe Coburg on 16 June 1826. Pirie & Co. outfitted Prince of Saxe Coburg for a sealing voyage to the South Shetlands. Having come from London, on 20 July she sailed from Bona Vista, Cape Verde for the South Shetlands.

Fate 
While off the South Shetlands Prince of Saxe Coburg encountered bad weather and pack-ice. Brisbane sailed to Tierra del Fuego to effect repairs. On 16 December 1826, as she was at anchor in Cockburn Channel, violent williwaws drove her ashore and wrecked her. All 21 crew members survived, and were able to rescue three boats and provisions. The men established a camp. In subsequent weeks one man died and an accidental explosion of a casks of gunpowder severely injured another. Three crew members became mutinous and were exiled to three separate islands with a week's provisions each. Eventually Brisbane permitted seven crew members to take the largest boat. These men survived and joined a Buenos Aires squadron operating against Brazil. Brisbane sent the other two boats out to scout for possible rescuers. On 3 March 1827 one boat encountered , under the command of Captain Pringle Stokes, who sent two launches 80 miles through the Barbara Channel to rescue Brisbane and the remaining survivors from Prince of Saxe Coburg''.

Citations

1803 ships
Age of Sail merchant ships of England
Sealing ships
Maritime incidents in December 1826